The 2014 Australian GT Championship was a CAMS sanctioned Australian motor racing championship open to FIA GT3 cars and similar cars as approved for the championship. The Australian GT Sportscar Group Pty Ltd was appointed by CAMS as the Category Manager for the championship. The title, which was the 18th Australian GT Championship, was won by Richard Muscat, driving a Mercedes-Benz SLS AMG GT3.

Race calendar

The championship was contested over a six-round series.

The results for each round of the Championship were determined by the number of points scored by each driver within their division at that round.

Divisions
Drivers' titles were awarded in four divisions.
 GT Championship - for FIA GT3 specification vehicles
 GT Trophy - for older specification FIA GT3 vehicles
 GT Challenge - for cars that no longer fitted within the GT Championship and GT Trophy divisions
 GT Sports - for GT4 specification cars

Points system
Championship points were awarded to each eligible driver, based on their qualifying position at each round of the Championship relative to the other drivers within their division, and on their finishing position in each race of the Championship relative to the other drivers within their division, in accordance with the following table.

Championship results

 The driver gaining the highest points total over all rounds of the Championship, within their division, was declared the winner of that division.
 If two drivers competed in the same automobile for all, or the majority of the rounds, then the final division position was awarded to both drivers.

2014 Australian Tourist Trophy
The 2014 Australian Tourist Trophy was awarded by the Confederation of Australian Motor Sport to the driver accumulating the highest aggregate points total from Rounds 2 and 6 of the Australian GT Championship. The title, which was the 24th Australian Tourist Trophy, was won by Richard Muscat driving a Mercedes-Benz SLS AMG GT3.

References

External links

Australian GT Championship
GT